Agasphaerops is a genus of broad-nosed weevils in the beetle family Curculionidae. There are at least two described species in Agasphaerops.

Species
These two species belong to the genus Agasphaerops:
 Agasphaerops niger Horn, 1876 g
 Agasphaerops nigra Horn, 1876 i c g b (lily weevil)
Data sources: i = ITIS, c = Catalogue of Life, g = GBIF, b = Bugguide.net

References

Further reading

 
 
 
 

Entiminae
Articles created by Qbugbot